Alison Towers Settle née Alison Violet de Froideville Fuchs (18 January 1891 in Clapham, London – 14 September 1980 in Worthing, Sussex) was a British fashion journalist and editor. Settle's career in fashion journalism spanned over five decades, from the 1910s to the 1970s. She wrote for publications including The Observer and The Lady, edited British Vogue from 1926 to 1935, and belonged to government bodies tasked with improving British design and taste. Alison Settle's archive is located at the University of Brighton Design Archives.

Personal life
She was the second child of Margaret (Maggie) Campbell Munro and Georg Friedrich Gotthilf Fuchs, Premier Lieutenant of the Landwehr and descendant of the Central European aristocratic family Monod de Froideville. Her older brother was the zoologist Harold Munro Fox. Settle intended to read History at the University of Oxford, and won a bursary to Somerville College, but was unable to attend because of lack of funds. In 1914, she became engaged to the barrister Alfred Towers Settle, marrying him four years later in November 1918. Alfred died of tuberculosis in 1925, leaving Settle with their two young children Margaret and John. She never remarried.

Career
In 1926, Settle became editor of British Vogue, working for Edna Woolman Chase, the American editor-in-chief of the three existing editions of Vogue, staying in her position for the next 9 years. Under her management, the magazine first employed influential writers including Virginia Woolf, Edith Sitwell and Vita Sackville-West.

Settle left Vogue in 1935 under strained circumstances, spending the subsequent year writing the book Clothes Line, published in 1937. In that year' she also became the fashion editor of The Observer, retiring in 1960. A year after her retirement, she received the OBE for services to the journalism of fashion. She was also a fashion columnist for The Lady for 27 years until 1972, which ended after Settle had a serious accident in Paris. Her book Fashion As A Career was published in 1963. Settle moved to Steyning (Sussex) after World War II. She died in Worthing on the autumn of 1980, at 89.

References

1891 births
1980 deaths
English columnists
English women journalists
British women columnists
20th-century British women writers
English fashion journalists
Fashion editors
Writers from London
Women magazine editors
British Vogue
20th-century English women
20th-century English people